Pomaderris elachophylla, commonly known as lacy pomaderris, small leaf pomaderris or small-leaf dogwood,<ref name="NRET">{{cite web |title=Pomaderris elachophylla''' |url=https://naturalvaluesatlas.tas.gov.au/downloadattachment?id=14418 |publisher=Tasmanian Government Department of Natural Resources and Environment Tasmania |access-date=7 February 2022}}</ref> is a species of flowering plant in the family Rhamnaceae and is endemic to south-eastern Australia. It is a slender shrub with densely hairy branchlets, egg-shaped leaves, and cream-coloured flowers arranged singly or in clusters in leaf axils.

The upper surface of the leaves is glabrous and the lower surface densely covered with whitish and sometimes rust-coloured, star-shaped hairs. Flowering occurs from November to December and the fruit is a hairy capsule.

TaxonomyPomaderris elachophylla was first formally described in 1861 by Ferdinand von Mueller in Fragmenta Phytographiae Australiae. The specific epithet (elachophylla) means "small, short-leaved".

Distribution and habitat
Lacy pomaderris grows in tall, damp forest in gullies and near creeks from south-east of Bombala in new South Wales, from near Portland to the Cobberas Range in Victoria and in scattered places in Tasmania.

Conservation status
This pomaderris is listed as "endangered" in New South Wales, under the Biodiversity Conservation Act 2016 (NSW)''. The main threats to the species include forestry operations, inappropriate fire regimes, grazing by domestic stock and maintenance of roadside reserves.

References

elachophylla
Flora of New South Wales
Flora of Victoria (Australia)
Flora of Tasmania
Plants described in 1861
Taxa named by Ferdinand von Mueller